WQPD (100.5 FM, "Q100.5") is a radio station broadcasting a hot adult contemporary format. Licensed to Marion, South Carolina, United States, the station serves the Florence area. The station is currently owned by Cumulus Media.

History
Classy 100.5 signed on in December 1991.

The first call letters for the 100.5 frequency were WQTI, at the same time the call letters WQTR went to what is now WWFN-FM.

WKSY played country music.

Cumulus Media bought classic rock WHSC-FM 98.5, alternative rock WBZF 100.5, and WMXT. The adult contemporary format from WMXT moved to 100.5, while alternative rock moved to 98.5. Later, the letters WFSF were used. Formats on 100.5 FM have included adult contemporary and contemporary hit radio (CHR).

Prior to 2003, the WHLZ call letters, "Wheelz" name and country format belonged to a station in Manning, South Carolina, which moved to Charleston, South Carolina and became WIHB.

On July 3, 2013, at 3 p.m., WHLZ rebranded as "Nash FM 100.5".

On April 17, 2017, after stunting with music from each decade from the 1960s through the 1990s, WHLZ changed their format from country to hot adult contemporary, branded as "Q100.5" under the new WQPD call sign. The format includes Bob and Sheri in the mornings and an automated Westwood One-originated format the remainder of the day and weekends.

References

External links

1992 establishments in South Carolina
Cumulus Media radio stations
Hot adult contemporary radio stations in the United States
Radio stations established in 1992
QPD